Hancock Whitney Stadium is a 25,450-seat multi-purpose stadium on the campus of the University of South Alabama in Mobile, Alabama. It is the home of the South Alabama Jaguars football program, starting with the 2020 season. The stadium carries the name of Hancock Whitney, a bank holding company headquartered in Gulfport, Mississippi, while its playing surface is designated as the Abraham A. Mitchell Field, named after a substantial donor to the program. Hancock Whitney Stadium is located on the west part of the South Alabama campus near the football field house, practice fields, and Jaguar Training Center, which is the largest covered practice facility in the state of Alabama.

History
Construction on Hancock Whitney Stadium started on August 6, 2018, and cost $78 million.  The stadium opened with on September 12, 2020, with a college football game against the Tulane Green Wave. Due to COVID-19 restrictions, capacity for the opener and all other 2020 games was capped at 6,000 spectators to allow for social distancing.

Hancock Whitney Stadium serves as home of the Senior Bowl, a postseason college football all-star game, since the 2021 edition. The game had previously been held at Ladd–Peebles Stadium for nearly 70 years.  Since the 2021 edition, Hanrock Whitney Stadium has also served as home of the LendingTree Bowl, a postseason college bowl game, following 22 years at Ladd–Peebles.

Facility features

 11 Suites
 42 Loge boxes
 Terrace standing room with drink rails (that can convert into a concert stage)
 Ample concourse room
 Up to 96 points-of-sale for concessions
 Musco LED lighting (ability to create light show)
 Daktronics high definition video board (top 40 in the country)
 Daktronics high definition ribbon boards and sound system

Attendance records

References

2020 establishments in Alabama
American football venues in Alabama
Multi-purpose stadiums in the United States
Senior Bowl
South Alabama Jaguars football
South Alabama Jaguars sports venues
Sports venues completed in 2020